Convergence (sometimes referenced as C*) is the annual net.goth party run by and for members of the alt.gothic and alt.gothic.fashion newsgroup, and other related Usenet newsgroups. Started in 1995, it is a chance for net.goths and others who normally only meet on the Internet to meet. Events at Convergence typically included live bands and club nights, bazaars, fashion, art shows, panels, and tours of goth-themed locales in the host city.

Location 

Convergence is a "floating" event. The location for each year voted on by the net.goth community in response to proposals by volunteer committees. So far all have taken place in North America.

Past Convergences have been held in:
Convergence 1 (June 23–24, 1995): Chicago
Convergence 2 (August 9–11, 1996): Boston
Convergence 3 (August 1–3, 1997): San Francisco
Convergence 4 (August 21–23, 1998): Toronto
Convergence 5 (April 2–4, 1999): New Orleans
Convergence 6 (May 26–29, 2000): Seattle
Convergence 7 (August 17–19, 2001): New York
Convergence 8 (May 31-June 2, 2002): Montreal
Convergence 9 (April 25–27, 2003): Las Vegas
Convergence 10 (May 7–9, 2004): Chicago, Illinois
Convergence 11 (April 22–25, 2005): San Diego
Convergence 12 (April 13–16, 2006): New Orleans, Louisiana
Convergence 13 (May 25–27, 2007): Portland
Convergence 14 (August 8–11, 2008): Ybor City (Tampa, FL)
Convergence 15 (July 17–20, 2009): Long Beach
Convergence 16 (August 13–16, 2010): Park City, Utah
Convergence 17 (June 24–26, 2011): Cozumel, Mexico
Convergence 18 (June 15–17, 2012): Buffalo, New York
Convergence 19 (April 18–22, 2013): Austin
Convergence 20 (April 25–27, 2014): Chicago
Convergence 21 (May 1–3, 2015): Hollywood
Convergence 22 (March 25–27, 2016): New Orleans
Convergence 23 (May 19–21, 2017): Dallas, Texas
Convergence 24 (April 27–29, 2018): Detroit, Michigan
Convergence 25 (May 3–5, 2019): Boston, Massachusetts

Attendance 
Convergence was initially proposed and planned by two long-time members of the alt.gothic newsgroup hierarchy, at the time residents of Chicago, as an international gathering of members of the newsgroups and related net.goth groups. It was conceived as an opportunity for those who had previously known each other primarily or exclusively through Internet forums, to meet and get to know each other in person.

There has been considerable debate regarding the extent to which the event should reach out to other on-line gothic communities, as well as members of local non-Internet-based gothic scenes. Some planning committees have made efforts to expand the scope of the event; while others have made similar efforts to restrict advertising to predominantly the founding net.goth communities.

Attendance ranged over the years usually between 300-800, but attendance spiked at Convergence 13 to approximately 1,500.

Organization 

There is no formal Convergence organization per se. Since shortly after its inception, the bidding and voting process has been managed by a more-or-less consistent group of volunteers, known informally as the C*b*l, composed of several of the longest-term participants in the alt.gothic newsgroups. The C*b*l is widely recognized as having made some of the most substantial contributions to maintaining Convergence, and are among its most frequent attendees. The group also maintains the official Convergence website, and provides organizational and informational assistance to host committees.

Each Convergence is organized and run by an ad hoc volunteer committee. Committees typically consist of residents of the host city, a large percentage of whom are expected to be active participants on alt.gothic or related net.goth groups.

See also
List of electronic music festivals
List of gothic festivals

References

External links

 Convergence website
 A Brief History of Convergence website
 Convergence 14 website
 Convergence 15 website
 Convergence 16 website
 Convergence 20 website
 Convergence live journal

Goth festivals
Electronic music festivals in the United States
1995 establishments in Illinois
Goth subculture
Electronic music festivals in Canada
Music festivals established in 1995